Karon is a community development block that forms an administrative division in the Madhupur subdivision of the Deoghar district, Jharkhand state, India.

Geography

It is located 48 km from Deoghar, the district headquarters.

Deoghar district, a plateau region, is broadly divided into two sub-micro regions – the Dumka-Godda Uplands and Deoghar Uplands. The Dumka-Godda Uplands covers the north-eastern portion of the district. The Deoghar Uplands covers the south-western portion of the district.

There are some isolated peaks in the district – Phuljori (2,312 ft), 18 miles from Madhupur, Degaria (1,716 ft), 3 miles from Baidyanath Junction, Patharda (1,603 ft), 8 miles from Madhupur, Tirkut Parvat (2,470 ft), 10 miles from Deoghar on the Dumka-Deoghar Road and some more.

Karon CD block is bounded by Madhupur CD block on the north, Sarath CD block on the east, Karmatanr CD block in Jamtara district on the south, and Margomunda CD block on the west.

Karon CD block has an area of 157.21 km2.Karon police station serves this block. Headquarters of this CD block is at Karon village.

Gram panchayats in Karon CD block are Badhanadih, Badiya, Bara, Birangadia, Dindakoli, Ganjewari, Karown, Kasaiya, Nagadari, Pathrol, Ranidih, Saltar, Sirsa and Tekra.

Demographics

Population
As per the 2011 Census of India Karon CD block had a total population of 88,251, all of which were rural. There were 45,317 (51%) males and 42,934 (49%) females. Population below 6 years was 16,759. Scheduled Castes numbered 11,017 (12.48%) and Scheduled Tribes numbered 12,683 (14.37%).

Literacy
 census, the total number of literates in Karon CD block was 42,618 (59.61% of the population over age 6) out of whom 27,005 (63%) were males and 15,613 (37%) were females. The gender disparity (the difference between female and male literacy rates) was 26%.

See also – List of Jharkhand districts ranked by literacy rate

Language and religion
According to the District Census Handbook, Deoghar, 2011 census, as of 2001, Khortha was the mother-tongue of 429,959 persons forming 36.89% of the population of Deoghar district, followed by Hindi 415,142 persons (35.62%), Santali 122,502 persons (10.51%), and other languages (with no details) 197,787 perons (16.97%). (In the Census Handbook of Deoghar district, the mother-tongue information is mentioned as that of Giridih district – it is hoped that it is a printing mistake).

Hindi is the official language in Jharkhand and Urdu has been declared as an additional official language.

According to the District Census Handbook, Deoghar, 2011 census, Hindus numbered 1,165,140 and formed 78.04% of the population of Deoghar district, followed by Muslims 302,626 (20.27%), Christians 6,027 (0.40%), Jains 282 (0.02%), Buddhists 188 (0.013%), Sikhs (0.010%), other religions 16,067 (1.08%), religion not stated 1,600 (0.11%).

Rural poverty
50-60% of the population of Deoghar district were in the BPL category in 2004–2005, being in the same category as Pakur, Sahebganj and Garhwa districts. Rural poverty in Jharkhand declined from 66% in 1993–94 to 46% in 2004–05. In 2011, it has come down to 39.1%.

Economy

Livelihood

In Karon CD block in 2011, amongst the class of total workers, cultivators numbered 8,029 and formed 24.12%, agricultural labourers numbered 13,435 and formed 40.36%, household industry workers numbered 3,251 and formed 9.77% and other workers numbered 8,576 and formed 25.76%.  Total workers numbered 33,291 and formed 37.72% of the total population. Non-workers numbered 54,960 and formed  62.28% of total population.

Note: In the census records a person is considered a cultivator, if the person is engaged in cultivation/ supervision of land owned. When a person who works on another person's land for wages in cash or kind or share, is regarded as an agricultural labourer. Household industry is defined as an industry conducted by one or more members of the family within the household or village, and one that does not qualify for registration as a factory under the Factories Act. Other workers are persons engaged in some economic activity other than cultivators, agricultural labourers and household workers.  It includes factory, mining, plantation, transport and office workers, those engaged in business and commerce, teachers and entertainment artistes.

Infrastructure
There are 141 inhabited villages in Karon CD block. In 2011, 99 villages had power supply. Thirteen villages had tap water (treated/ untreated), 134 villages had well water (covered/ uncovered), 129 villages had hand pumps, and six villages had no drinking water facility. Eight villages had post offices, ten villages had sub post offices, six villages had telephones (land lines), 16 villages had public call offices and 57 villages had mobile phone coverage. Two villages had bank branches, 141 villages had ATMs, one village had agricultural credit society, one village had cinema/ video hall. 32 villages had public distribution system, thirteen villages had weekly haat (market) and 59 villages had assembly polling stations.

Agriculture
The agricultural sector absorbs around two-thirds of the workforce in the district. In Karon CD block, the cultivable area formed 39.11% of the total area, and the irrigated area formed 15.95% of the cultivable area.

Jungles in the plain areas have almost been cleared and even hills are becoming naked in an area once known for its extensive forests.

Coal
The principal coalfield of the Deoghar group is Jayanti Coalfield, located near Karon. The main part of the coalfield lies south-west of the Jainti River. It covers an area of 24 square miles.

Backward Regions Grant Fund
Deoghar district is listed as a backward region and receives financial support from the Backward Regions Grant Fund.  The fund created by the Government of India is designed to redress regional imbalances in development. As of 2012, 272 districts across the country were listed under this scheme. The list includes 21 districts of Jharkhand.

Education
Karon CD block had 27 villages with pre-primary schools, 106 villages with primary schools, 37 villages with middle schools, 3 villages with secondary schools, 1 village with senior secondary school, 31 villages with no educational facility.
.*Senior secondary schools are also known as Inter colleges in Jharkhand

Healthcare
Karon CD block had 2 villages with primary health centres, 6 villages with primary health subcentres, 1 village with maternity and child welfare centre, 1 village with TB clinic, 3 villages with allopathic hospitals, x village with dispensary, x village with veterinary hospital, 1 village with family welfare centre, 11 villages with medicine shops.
.*Private medical practitioners, alternative medicine etc. not included

References

Community development blocks in Deoghar district